Timothy Parker may refer to:

 Timothy Parker (puzzle designer) (born 1960)
 Timothy Britten Parker (born 1962), American stage, film, and television actor
 Gift of Gab (rapper) (Timothy Jerome Parker), American rapper
 Tim Parker (born 1955), British businessman
 Tim Parker (soccer) (born 1993), American soccer player